Denis Duda (born 14 February 1996) is an Albanian professional footballer who plays as a midfielder for Apolonia Fier in the Albanian First Division.

References

External links
 

1996 births
Living people
Sportspeople from Fier
Albanian footballers
Association football midfielders
Flamurtari Vlorë players
KS Turbina Cërrik players
KS Albpetrol Patos players
KF Apolonia Fier players
Kategoria Superiore players
Kategoria e Parë players